

References

Bibliography 
Rayfield, D. (2013) Edge of Empires: A History of Georgia, Reaktion Books, 
W.E.D. Allen (1970) Russian Embassies to the Georgian Kings, 1589–1605, Hakluyt Society,  (hbk)

Georgian family trees
Bagrationi dynasty of the Kingdom of Kakheti
Bagrationi dynasty of the Kingdom of Kartli-Kakheti
Kakheti Bagrationi dynasty